Javier Pérez-Tenessa is a Mexican entrepreneur, businessman, investor, composer and producer based in Barcelona, Spain, who has founded several companies, including publicly traded eDreams and Venture Capital firm 4Founders Capital.

Early life and education 

Pérez-Tenessa was born in Mexico, and moved to Spain aged 10. He graduated from the French Lycée in Madrid in 1984. For this he received the "Francisco Arranz" price of the "colegio español de ingenieros aeronáuticos". In 1995 he attended the Stanford Graduate School of Business, where he earned his MBA in 1997.

Career 
Pérez-Tenessa started his career designing satellites in France with Aérospatiale and working on Jet Engine Turbines at Pratt and Whitney in the United States. He joined McKinsey and Company in 1993. After two years with the firm, he moved to Silicon Valley to pursue his MBA and in 1996 he joined Netscape, the company which created the first internet browser.

He founded eDreams in 1999 in the Valley but quickly moved operations and focus to Europe. He acted as CEO of eDreams and of its successor eDreams ODIGEO from 1999 to 2015.

During his tenure as CEO, he led the company through five private equity transactions, several private and public debt issuances, three acquisitions and an IPO, which he completed in April 2014, and valued the company at €1.5 billion at the time. eDreams is the only internet startup in Spain to have been listed publicly in the main market. It was also the first Internet Unicorn in the country. In 2015, Perez-Tenessa resigned from his role as CEO and Chairman of eDreams, and remained as its Honorary Chairman.

In 2017 he co-founded SeedRocket 4Founders, a venture capital firm investing in early stage technology companies. He is an investor both personally and through 4Founders in a large number of technology companies around the world.

In 2019 the Universidad Poliltécnica de Madrid awards him the ActúaUPM 2019 Honorary Award for his "career, ability to excel (...), which serve as an example for all those entrepreneurs who present themselves each year to the actuaupm Competition" 

He has been in the board of several companies including those in the eDreams Group, Vueling airlines and Lastminute.com Group.

Music 
Perez-Tenessa has produced a number of musical theater plays, notably the Spanish productions of Rent in 2016, and Fun Home in 2018. He has composed several pieces which are available to the public in SoundCloud. He has performed both the bass and tenor voices in the Choir for Handel's Messiah at the Palau de La Musica in Barcelona.

References 

Living people
Aerospace engineers
Mexican chief executives
Polytechnic University of Madrid alumni
Stanford Graduate School of Business alumni
Mexican venture capitalists
Mexican musicians
Year of birth missing (living people)